Enchoria lacteata is a species of geometrid moth in the family Geometridae.

The MONA or Hodges number for Enchoria lacteata is 7403.

References

Further reading

External links

 

Xanthorhoini
Articles created by Qbugbot
Moths described in 1876